Parton v Milk Board (Vic), is a High Court of Australia case that dealt with the meaning of excise in relation to section 90 of the Australian Constitution.

In this case, the tax was calculated as a fixed amount per gallon of milk, and imposed on retailers, instead of at the production phase; this was held to be invalid as imposing a duty of excise. This heralded in the broad approach to section 92 - where a "tax upon a commodity at any point in the course of distribution before it reaches the consumer produces the same effect as a tax upon its manufacture or production" (per Dixon J). Rich and Williams JJ agreed with Dixon J, stating that a tax at a later stage in the handling of a good is in effect a tax on the production or manufacture of the good.

Latham CJ dissented, using Peterswald v Bartley, and McTiernan J felt that it should be employed in a narrower sense, to make it fit within what he perceived to be the object of the section, which was to promote a "uniform fiscal policy for the Commonwealth".

See also 

 Section 90 of the Constitution of Australia
 Australian constitutional law

References 

 Winterton, G. et al. Australian federal constitutional law: commentary and materials, 1999. LBC Information Services, Sydney.

High Court of Australia cases
1949 in Australian law
Excise in the Australian Constitution cases
1949 in case law